Mark Ian Burns (born 18 September 1967) is an English cricketer.  Burns is a right-handed batsman who bowls right-arm medium pace and who fields as a wicket-keeper.  He was born in Bury, Lancashire.

Burns made his debut for Cumberland in the 2002 MCCA Knockout Trophy against Northumberland.  He played one more Trophy match in 2002, against the Durham Cricket Board.  His Minor Counties Championship debut came against Suffolk in the same season, with Burms making a further appearance against Bedfordshire.  In his sole season with Cumberland, Smith played two List A matches against the Nottinghamshire Cricket Board and Devon, both in the 2003 Cheltenham & Gloucester Trophy which was held in 2002.  His only List A run came against Devon, with Burns being dismissed by Andrew Procter in that match.  Behind the stumps he took 4 catches and made 2 stumpings.

References

External links
Mark Burns at ESPNcricinfo
Mark Burns at CricketArchive

1967 births
Living people
Cricketers from Bury, Greater Manchester
English cricketers
Cumberland cricketers
Wicket-keepers